This list of peace prizes is an index to articles on notable prizes awarded for contributions towards achieving or maintaining peace. The list is organized by region and country of the sponsoring organization, but many of the prizes are open to people from around the world.

United Nations

Americas

Asia

Europe

Oceania

See also
 List of peace activists
 List of awards for contributions to society
 Lists of awards

References